Apogee is the second full-length album by stoner metal band Bongzilla. The album was released in May 2000 by Ritual Records, and re-released in 2004 by Relapse Records. It contains three songs recorded in the studio and four recorded at a live concert.

Track listing

References

Bongzilla albums
2000 albums